Phaniola is a genus of moths belonging to the family Tortricidae.

Species
Phaniola caboana Razowski & Becker, 2007
Phaniola implicata Razowski & Becker, 2003

See also
List of Tortricidae genera

References

 , 2011: Diagnoses and remarks on genera of Tortricidae, 2: Cochylini (Lepidoptera: Tortricidae). Shilap Revista de Lepidopterologia 39 (156): 397–414.
 , 2003, Polskie Pismo Ent. 72: 156
 ,2005 World Catalogue of Insects, 6

External links
tortricidae.com

Cochylini
Tortricidae genera